The 67th Primetime Emmy Awards honored the best in US prime time television programming from June 1, 2014 until May 31, 2015, as chosen by the Academy of Television Arts & Sciences. The ceremony was held on Sunday, September 20, 2015 at the Microsoft Theater in Downtown Los Angeles, California, and was broadcast in the U.S. by Fox. Andy Samberg hosted the show for the first time. The nominations were announced on July 16, 2015.

The Creative Arts Emmy Awards ceremony was held on September 12 and was broadcast by FXX on September 19.

The Primetime Engineering Emmy Awards ceremony was held on October 28, 2015 at the Loews Hollywood Hotel.

The ceremony became notable for breaking two major milestones: Game of Thrones set a new record by winning 12 awards, the most for any show in a single year, up to this date (it was also the second HBO show, after The Sopranos, to win the Outstanding Drama Series award), while Viola Davis became the first African-American woman in Emmy history to win Outstanding Lead Actress in a Drama Series for her performance as Annalise Keating in How to Get Away with Murder.

This year also saw for the first time, two Streaming service networks win four Acting awards: Netflix, with Uzo Aduba in Orange Is the New Black and Reg E. Cathey in House of Cards; and Amazon Studios, with Jeffrey Tambor for Transparent and Bradley Whitford for the same show.

The Primetime Emmy Award for Outstanding Comedy Series went to the HBO political satire Veep, which not only broke Modern Familys five-year hold on the award but became the second time a premium channel won Outstanding Comedy Series (the first was for HBO's surrealist romantic comedy Sex and the City in 2001).

Rule changes
The Academy of Television Arts & Sciences announced new rule changes for the 67th Primetime Emmy Awards. These new rules are:

 All voters eligible for a category's nominations are now eligible to vote in that category, providing that they have seen the submitted material and attest to no specific conflicts of interest.
 The number of nominees in the Outstanding Drama Series and Outstanding Comedy Series categories will expand from six nominees to seven, due to the increase in series production.
 To clarify the difference between a Comedy series and a Drama series, any show where episodes average a length of 30 minutes is eligible to enter as a comedy and series with episodes that average a length of 1 hour is eligible as a drama. There may be exceptions to the rules, however: producers may formally petition to a new Academy panel to have the show be considered for the alternative category. This panel, consisting of five industry leaders appointed by the Academy chairman and four appointees from the Board of Governors, will vote on a decision. A two-thirds vote was required for the show to be considered for the alternative category. So far, three petitions have been successful: Glee, Jane the Virgin, and Shameless were voted as eligible for "Outstanding Comedy Series".
 The Outstanding Miniseries was renamed as "Outstanding Limited Series". A "Limited Series" is defined as a program consisting of two or more episodes totaling 150 minutes as a whole, tell a complete, non-recurring story, and do not have an ongoing storyline and/or main characters in subsequent seasons.
 A "Guest Actor" is now defined as a performer appearing in less than 50% of the program's episodes. Only performers that fit this criteria are allowed to submit.
 The Outstanding Variety Series category has been split into two separate categories: "Outstanding Variety Talk" and "Outstanding Variety Sketch".

Winners and nominees

Winners are listed first, highlighted in boldface, and indicated with a double dagger (‡). For simplicity, producers who received nominations for program awards, as well as nominated writers for Outstanding Writing for a Variety Series, have been omitted.

Programs

Acting

Lead performances

Supporting performances

Directing

Writing

Most major nominations
By network
 HBO – 37
 Comedy Central – 14
 ABC / FX / Netflix – 13
 AMC – 10
 PBS / Showtime – 9
 CBS / NBC – 7
 Fox – 6
 Amazon – 5
 Sundance TV – 4
 History – 2

By program
 American Horror Story: Freak Show (FX) – 8
 Game of Thrones (HBO) / Olive Kitteridge (HBO) – 7
 American Crime (ABC) / Bessie (HBO) / Mad Men (AMC) / Veep (HBO) – 6

Most major awards
By network
 HBO – 14
 Comedy Central – 4
 ABC / Amazon – 2

By program
 Olive Kitteridge (HBO) – 6
 Game of Thrones (HBO) / Veep (HBO) – 4
 The Daily Show with Jon Stewart (Comedy Central) – 3
 Transparent (Amazon) – 2

Notes

Presenters and performers
The awards were presented by the following:

Presenters

Performers

In Memoriam
The In Memoriam segment featured the song "Over the Rainbow" by Eva Cassidy:

 Mike Nichols
 Polly Bergen
 Jerry Weintraub
 B. B. King
 Wes Craven
 Gary Owens
 Clark Terry
 Anne Meara
 Taylor Negron
 Jack Rollins
 Martin Milner
 Bud Yorkin
 Stuart Scott
 Brandon Stoddard
 Merv Adelson
 Bob Simon
 Patrick Macnee
 Harris Wittels
 Glen A. Larson
 Stan Freberg
 James Best
 Jenna McMahon
 Harve Bennett
 Ed Sabol
 Ann Marcus
 Joan Rivers
 Ernest Kinoy
 Marty Pasetta
 Gilbert Lewis
 Albert Maysles
 Sam Simon
 Jack Carter
 Dick Van Patten
 Ian Fraser
 Jan Hooks
 Elizabeth Peña
 Howard Lipstone
 Frank Gifford
 Judy Carne
 Ray Charles
 Rod Taylor
 Donna Douglas
 Richard Dysart
 Joseph Sargent
 Edward Herrmann
 Jayne Meadows
 Alex Rocco
 Dean Jones
 Leonard Nimoy

Notes

References

External links
 Emmys.com list of 2015 Nominees & Winners
 Academy of Television Arts and Sciences website
 

067
2015 in American television
2015 in Los Angeles
2015 television awards
2015 awards in the United States
September 2015 events in the United States